South Korea competed at the 2007 World Championships in Athletics from August 25 to September 2. A team of 11 athletes was announced in preparation for the competition.

Results

Men

Decathlon

Women

References
11th IAAF World Championships in Athletics Entry list.

External links
Official competition website

Nations at the 2007 World Championships in Athletics
World Championships in Athletics
2007